USS Daiquiri (SP-1285) was a motorboat – one of a series of identical boats – planned and built by the U.S. Navy in the event they would be needed during World War I. Daiquiri was armed as a patrol craft and assigned to New England waterways under the cognizance of the 1st Naval District based at Kittery, Maine. She was sold when the war ended.

Constructed in Rhode Island 

Daiquiri, 62'4" motor boat, was constructed in 1917 at Bristol, Rhode Island, as Herreshoff Hull # 317. She was one of a group of identical craft built in the expectation that they would be needed by the Navy should the United States enter World War I.

World War I service 

Purchased by the Navy in mid-September 1917, she was commissioned in early October as USS Daiquiri (SP-1285) and performed patrol service for the 1st Naval District in New England waters for the rest of the conflict.

Post-war disposition 

Inactivated in April 1919, the boat was sold in March 1920.

References 
 
 Daiquiri (American Motor Boat, 1917). Served as USS Daiquiri (SP-1285) in 1917-1920

World War I patrol vessels of the United States
Patrol vessels of the United States Navy
Ships built in Bristol, Rhode Island
1917 ships